The LennonOno Grant for Peace is an award presented by artist and peace activist Yoko Ono. The grant, a sum of $50,000, has been awarded biennially to people and organisations chosen by Ono herself since 2002, in honour of Ono's late husband John Lennon.

Recipients 
2002
Zvi Goldstein
Khalil Rabah
2004
Mordechai Vanunu
Seymour Hersh
2006
Center for Constitutional Rights
Médecins Sans Frontières
2008
Iceland
Vandana Shiva
2010
Josh Fox
Barbara Kowalcyk
Michael Pollan
Alice Walker
2012
Lady Gaga
Rachel Corrie (awarded posthumously)
John Perkins
Christopher Hitchens (awarded posthumously)
Pussy Riot
2014
Jann Wenner
Jeremy Gilley
Art Production Fund
Jón Gnarr
2016 
Olafur Eliasson
Sir Anish Kapoor
Katalin Ladik
Ai Weiwei
2018 

Make the Road New York
Wounded Warrior Fund at Walter Reed National Military Center

References 

Peace awards
Awards established in 2002
Yoko Ono
John Lennon